|}

The Prix Foy is a Group 2 flat horse race in France open to thoroughbred colts and fillies aged four years or older. It is run at Longchamp over a distance of 2,400 metres (about 1½ miles), and it is scheduled to take place each year in September.

The race serves as a trial for the Prix de l'Arc de Triomphe, which is held at the same venue three weeks later.

History
The event is named in memory of Henri Foy (1872–1954), a long-serving member of the Société d'Encouragement, a former governing body of horse racing in France. It was established in 1955, and originally called the Prix Henri Foy.

The race was initially contested over 2,300 metres, and for a period it was open to horses aged three or older. It was cut to 2,200 metres in 1961, and the minimum age was raised to four in 1967. Its title was shortened to the Prix Foy in 1969.

The present system of race grading was introduced in 1971, and the Prix Foy was given Group 3 status. It was subsequently run on the same day as the Prix Niel, a similar event restricted to three-year-olds.

The race was extended to 2,400 metres in 1979. It was promoted to Group 2 level in 1998.

Three winners of the Prix Foy have achieved victory in the same year's Prix de l'Arc de Triomphe – Allez France (1974), Sagace (1984) and Waldgeist (2019). Three horses have won the Arc after being defeated in this event – Gold River (1981), All Along (1983) and Subotica (1992).

Prix Foy is eligible for geldings from 2020.

Records
Most successful horse (2 wins):
 Allez France – 1974, 1975
 Sagace – 1984, 1985
 Orfevre – 2012, 2013
 Waldgeist – 2018, 2019

Leading jockey (9 wins):
 Yves Saint-Martin – Suffren (1960), Acer (1964), Petrone (1968), Snow Castle (1972), Allez France (1974, 1975), Sagace (1984, 1985), Mersey (1986)

Leading trainer (10 wins):
 André Fabre – Ordinance (1987), Star Lift(1989), In the Wings (1990), Richard of York (1994), Carnegie (1995), Swain (1996), Shirocco (2006), Manduro (2007), Waldgeist (2018, 2019)

Leading owner (7 wins):
 Daniel Wildenstein – Petrone (1968), Allez France (1974, 1975), Sagace (1984, 1985), Mersey (1986), Star Lift (1989)

Winners since 1979

Earlier winners

 1955: Norman
 1956: Fric
 1957: Blockhaus
 1958: Primesautier
 1959: Bel Baraka
 1960: Suffren
 1961: Right Royal
 1962: Exbury
 1963: Misti
 1964: Acer
 1965: Sigebert
 1966: Taneb
 1967: Busted
 1968: Petrone
 1969: Park Top
 1970: Lorenzaccio
 1971: Prominent
 1972: Snow Castle
 1973: Direct Flight
 1974: Allez France
 1975: Allez France
 1976: Kasteel
 1977: Malacate
 1978: Trillion

See also
 List of French flat horse races

References

 France Galop / Racing Post:

 france-galop.com – A Brief History: Prix Foy.
 galopp-sieger.de – Prix Foy.
 horseracingintfed.com – International Federation of Horseracing Authorities – Prix Foy (2016).
 pedigreequery.com – Prix Foy – Longchamp.

Open middle distance horse races
Longchamp Racecourse
Horse races in France
Recurring sporting events established in 1955
1955 establishments in France